The Cheras–Kajang Expressway is an  controlled-access highway in the Klang Valley region of Peninsular Malaysia. It runs between the suburb of Cheras at the Kuala Lumpur–Selangor border and the township of Kajang in Selangor.

History
The expressway is part of a major expansion of Jalan Cheras, which consisted of a two-lane intercity road between Kajang and Cheras. Construction of the expressway commenced in late 1998 and, at a cost of RM275 million, was completed and began tolling on 15 January 1999. Having assumed a new name, the "Cheras–Kajang Expressway", and incorporated the mid-length of the original road into the expressway, the expressway consequently bisected Jalan Cheras into two at both ends of the original road: one at Kajang, and the other at Cheras, while remnants of the road's undeveloped routes between remain partially in use.

The Cheras–Kajang Expressway is among the first eight-lane dual carriageway in Malaysia, stretching from the Connaught Interchange in Cheras, Kuala Lumpur to Saujana Impian in Kajang. The expressway comprises one rest and service area and nine interchanges. The expressway has received substantial volumes of traffic to and from linked localities. Between 2003 and 2004 alone, traffic volume increased 4%, with an average of 187,000 vehicles per day utilising the expressway in the financial year of 2004.

The expressway used to have its own electronic toll collection system, known as the Saga Tag. On 1 July 2004, however, the Saga Tag was replaced by Touch 'n Go and Smart TAG systems.

Of the RM 275 million used to finance the expressway's construction, RM 210 million consisted of bonds issued by Grand Saga Sdn Bhd, the expressway's concession holder, and RM 59 million was a support loan from the government. Grand Saga was further provided compensation from the government for revisions of scheduled toll rate hikes. In 2003 and 2004, the government paid RM104.93 million in compensation, exclusive of waiving interest and repayment of the support loan. The government also extended the expressway's concession by two years to 18 September 2027 in 2002.

On 2 March 2012, the Kuala Lumpur bound Batu 9 toll plaza and Kajang bound Batu 11 toll plaza of the expressway were abolished by the government due to a strong petition led by Eddie Ng Tien Chee from the Democratic Action Party. This petition was signed by 100,000 residents of the area.

Incidents

Bandar Mahkota Cheras exit

During the construction of Bandar Mahkota Cheras, an access road connecting the new township and the Bandar Tun Hussein Onn exit was built by the developer to provide access to Bandar Mahkota Cheras from Cheras–Kajang Expressway and vice versa. However, the link road was closed in January 2006 by Grand Saga under the direction of the Malaysian Highway Authority due to disputes between Grand Saga and the developer of Bandar Mahkota Cheras on compensations since the link road would allow motorists to bypass the Batu 11 toll plaza on the expressway. As a result, residents travelling to Kuala Lumpur are required to enter the expressway via Bandar Sungai Long or vice versa, while having to pay fares for both the Batu 9 and Batu 11 toll plazas.

Following Opposition control of Selangor in the 2008 election, local residents dismantled the barricades, temporarily allowing traffic to and from the township to directly enter and exit the expressway. In an early attempt, Grand Saga forcefully reclosed the road. However, On 27 June 2008, the barrier was torn down once again.

On 4 June 2008, the Malaysian Highway Authority and Grand Saga were ordered to install traffic lights on the junctions of Bandar Mahkota Cheras to ease the traffic flow of the residents. Today, the access road connecting Bandar Mahkota Cheras and Bandar Tun Hussein Onn Interchange is open.

Tolls
The Cheras–Kajang Expressway uses the opened toll systems.

Electronic Toll Collections (ETC)
As part of an initiative to facilitate faster transaction at the Batu 9 and Batu 11 Toll Plaza, all toll transactions at both toll plazas on the Cheras–Kajang Expressway has now been conducted electronically via Touch 'n Go cards or SmartTAGs starting 13 January 2016.

Toll rates
(Starting 15 October 2015)

Batu 9 Toll Plaza (Kajang bound)

Batu 11 toll plaza (KL bound)

Note: Toll charges can only be paid with the Touch 'n Go cards or SmartTAG. Cash payment is not accepted.
(Source: Grand Saga Sdn Bhd))

List of interchanges
The entire expressway is located within the Hulu Langat District in Selangor.

References

External links
 Official Grand Saga website

1999 establishments in Malaysia
Expressways in Malaysia
Expressways and highways in the Klang Valley